Nordstromia recava is a moth in the family Drepanidae. It was described by Watson in 1968. It is found in the Chinese provinces of Zhejiang and Jiangsu.

References

Moths described in 1968
Drepaninae